Ortilia is a genus of butterflies of the family Nymphalidae found in South America.

Species
Listed alphabetically:
 Ortilia dicoma (Hewitson, 1864) – Dicoma crescent
 Ortilia gentina Higgins, 1981 – Gentina crescent
 Ortilia ithra (Kirby, 1900) – Ithra crescent
 Ortilia liriope (Cramer, [1775])
 Ortilia orthia (Hewitson, 1864) – Orthia crescent
 Ortilia orticas (Schaus, 1902)
 Ortilia polinella (Hall, 1928)
 Ortilia sejona (Schaus, 1902)
 Ortilia velica (Hewitson, 1864) – Velica crescent

References

Melitaeini
Nymphalidae of South America
Butterfly genera
Taxa named by Robert P. Higgins